Hlawga railway station is a railway station on the Yangon Circular Railway in Yangon, Burma.

References

Railway stations in Yangon